De Lesseps Lake Airport  is located on the eastern shore of De Lesseps Lake in Thunder Bay District, Ontario, Canada. It is open from May 1 to September 30.

References

External links
Page about this airport on COPA's Places to Fly airport directory

Registered aerodromes in Ontario